Bob Rooney may refer to:

 Bob Rooney (Married... with Children), a character on Married... with Children
 Bob Rooney (soccer), U.S. soccer center forward
 Bobby Rooney (1938–2016), Scottish football winger